Bulman is an English surname. It was originally given to bull keepers, from the Middle English bule (bull) + man (man), and was chiefly found in Northumberland. Notable people with the surname include:

Dannie Bulman (born 1979), British soccer player
George Bulman (1896–1963), British pilot
Matt Bulman (born 1986), British soccer player
Nachman Bulman (1925–2002), American rabbi
Orville Bulman (1904–1978), American painter
Tim Bulman (born 1982), American football player

References

Surnames of English origin
Occupational surnames